As Live as It Gets is the third release and first live album by English heavy metal band Blaze Bayley, then known as Blaze, released in 2003. It features mostly the band's original material, though they also play some Iron Maiden and Wolfsbane covers, as lead singer Blaze Bayley used to be in both bands. The band also covers the Led Zeppelin track "Dazed and Confused", which appeared earlier as a studio track on the Led Zeppelin tribute album The Music Remains the Same.

As Live as It Gets is the last Blaze album to feature the complete original line-up, as Jeff Singer and Rob Naylor would leave the band later on in 2003.

Track listing

Personnel 
Blaze Bayley – vocals
Steve Wray – guitar
John Slater – guitar
Rob Naylor – bass
Jeff Singer – drums

Blaze Bayley live albums
2003 live albums
SPV/Steamhammer live albums